The Battle of Canton may refer to:

Battle of Canton (March 1841), fought in the First Opium War
Battle of Canton (May 1841), fought in the First Opium War
Expedition to Canton (1847), British military expedition
Battle of Canton (1856), fought in the Second Opium War
Battle of Canton (1857), fought in the Second Opium War
Battle of Guangzhou, fought in the Warlord Era
Second Battle of Guangzhou, fought in the Chiang-Gui War
Canton Operation, fought in the Second Sino-Japanese War